Silver Lake is an unincorporated community and census-designated place in western Lake County, Oregon, United States, along Oregon Route 31. As of the 2010 census, it had a population of 149. Facilities include a gas station and a small store, a post office, and a public school, North Lake School, serving grades K-12.

History 

The community of Silver Lake is located in the high desert of central Oregon. On December 9, 1875, the post office was established. The post office location has moved at least twice, depending on where the house of the postmaster was at the time.

According to Oregon Geographic Names, "The most important happening in the history of the community was a fire that occurred on December 24, 1894, in which 43 people lost their lives in the burning of one building." A fire broke out at a Christmas Eve celebration inside the crowded second-floor hall above a store. Ed O'Farrell rode  to Lakeview for medical help. After receiving the message, Doctor Bernard Daly drove his buggy over bad winter roads for 24 hours to reach Silver Lake. Doctor Daly's efforts to reach and treat the victims earned statewide recognition.

North Lake School in Silver Lake serves approximately 260 students from the towns of Silver Lake, Christmas Valley, and Fort Rock and consists of a single K-12 school building, which opened in 1991.

Sparsely populated, but seeing an increase as Bend grows, the area is ideal for those interested in the outdoors; hunting, fishing, hiking, camping, skiing, and bird watching are favorite activities of local residents. Wildlife is abundant in the area, such as mule deer, pronghorn antelope, elk, coyotes, badgers, eagles, and hawks.

Climate
This region experiences warm (but not hot) and dry summers, with no average monthly temperatures above .  According to the Köppen Climate Classification system, Silver Lake has a warm-summer Mediterranean climate, abbreviated "Csb" on climate maps.

Transportation

Demographics

References

External links
 New York Times article on fire in 1894

Unincorporated communities in Lake County, Oregon
Census-designated places in Oregon
1875 establishments in Oregon
Populated places established in 1875
Unincorporated communities in Oregon